Luis Gerardo Chávez Magallón (born 15 January 1996) is a Mexican professional footballer who plays as a midfielder for Liga MX club Pachuca and the Mexico national team.

International career
On 27 April 2022, Chávez made his senior national team debut under Gerardo Martino in a friendly match against Guatemala.

In October 2022, Chávez was named in Mexico's preliminary 31-man squad for the 2022 FIFA World Cup, and in November, he was ultimately included in the final 26-man roster. On 30 November, Chávez scored a goal from a free kick against Saudi Arabia as Mexico overpowered Saudi Arabia 2–1 to send Saudi Arabia out of the tournament. Despite his team's failure to progress from the group stage as well, his goal was a 30-yard free kick goal hailed as a "stunner" and "wonder goal" by the media.

Career statistics

Club

International

International goals
Scores and results list Mexico's goal tally first.

Honours
Pachuca
Liga MX: Apertura 2022

Individual
Liga MX All-Star: 2022

References

External links
 Luis Chávez at Club Tijuana
 
 

Living people
1996 births
Association football midfielders
Club Tijuana footballers
C.F. Pachuca players
Liga MX players
Liga Premier de México players
Footballers from Jalisco
2022 FIFA World Cup players
Mexican footballers